Efeler is a new [ilçe] (district) and second level municipality in Aydın Province, Turkey. According to Law, Act no. 6360, all Turkish provinces with a population more than 750,000, were declared metropolitan municipality. The law also created new districts within the capital city which have second level municipalities, in addition to the metropolitan municipality. Efeler happens to be one of them.

Thus, after 2014, the present Aydın central district was named Efeler and the name Aydın was reserved for the metropolitan municipality. Efeler is the plural of the title Efe and it refers to the irregular soldiers from the Aegean Region who fought during the Turkish War of Independence.

See also

Rural area

There were 5 towns and 57 villages in the rural area of Efeler. Now their status has become  .

References

Districts of Aydın Province
Efeler District